Makarovsky is a rural locality (a settlement) in Kemskoye Rural Settlement, Nikolsky District, Vologda Oblast, Russia. The population was 153 as of 2002.

Geography 
Makarovsky is located 62 km west of Nikolsk (the district's administrative centre) by road. Verkhovino is the nearest rural locality.

References 

Rural localities in Nikolsky District, Vologda Oblast